Mahesh Shinde is a politician from Satara district, Maharashtra. He is current Member of Maharashtra Legislative Assembly from Koregaon Vidhan Sabha constituency as a member of the Shiv Sena.
He is from Maratha Sardar Shinde family of Jakhangaon( near Khatgun) who are from Sardar Ranoji Shinde family.
His father and mother both were teachers.
He is well educated, scholar and closely related shishya to Guru Adrushkadsiddheshwar  Swamiji Kaneri Math Kolhapur.

Positions held
 2019: Elected to Maharashtra Legislative Assembly

References

External links
  Shivsena Home Page 

Shiv Sena politicians
1975 births
Living people